Josef "Sepp" Maier (11 May 1935 – 8 June 2012) was a German cross-country skier. He competed in the men's 30 kilometre event at the 1960 Winter Olympics.

References

External links
 

1935 births
2012 deaths
German male cross-country skiers
Olympic cross-country skiers of the United Team of Germany
Cross-country skiers at the 1960 Winter Olympics
People from Breisgau-Hochschwarzwald
Sportspeople from Freiburg (region)